Karadere is one of the last remaining unblighted by mass tourism development areas with a wild beach on the Bulgarian Black Sea coast. The name derives from the Turkish kara meaning black and dere meaning gully. Situated to the northern slopes of the Balkan Mountains, Karadere is about 5 kilometers away from the town of Byala and the village of Goritsa, Varna Province. The beach spans 5 kilometers in length and is bordered by a mixed oak forest, vineyards and cultivated land. The mouths of the Karadere river and the Byala river are situated on the beach. Although Karadere is relatively close to the town and village, it is difficult to reach because there is no infrastructure. Bumpy dirt roads and tracks lead to the beach where there is no cell phone service, electricity, tap water, sewage or any other urban facilities. Despite the lack of main utilities and facilities, Karadere has unique natural offerings—the fine sand, the clean sea water, the fresh air, the sunny weather, the spring water, the mud baths and even the opportunity to spot a dolphin in the bay.

It is one of very few places on the Bulgarian coast still permitting free camping. The free camping consists predominantly of tents, which are pitched on the sand or in the forest above shore. There are also caravans, but they are confined to the northernmost part due to the difficulty to transport them to the southern side of the beach. A diverse group of people camp on and visit Karadere. Families with children, extreme water sportsmen, nature lovers, artists, people with different occupation and any adventurers from different parts of Bulgaria and abroad prefer Karadere to the numerous overcrowded mass tourism resorts along Bulgaria's coastline. Additionally, the wild beach is suited for topless and nude sunbathing. The beach is popular with Bulgarians, who gather in mass there to see the sunrise on 1 July.

Karadere is part of the EU's eco network Natura 2000 network, in the protected area Kamchiyska Planina, for the conservation of bird species and protected area Shkorpilovtsi Beach for the conservation of the conservation of natural habitats, wild flora and fauna.

A company known as Madara Europe has recently been attempting to revive a development plan for Karadere first proposed several years ago by Georgi Stanishev, brother of former Bulgarian Prime Minister Sergei Stanishev. The project, known as Black Sea Gardens, sparked protests in Sofia and Varna when trees began to be cleared in 2014.

Journalists have been able to identify some of the investors in the project, although some have still managed to remain hidden behind a maze of offshore companies.

The Sofia-bases company Maxi-I plans to build a luxurious camp site which would restrict the current free camping with tents and caravans. The camp site will consist of large scale constructions: family bungalows, villas, public service buildings, restaurants, shops, bars, playgrounds, toilets, a park, a spa center and streets. The campsite is expected to accommodate up to 1860 people and 670 vehicles.

Notable investors in Madara Europe include:

 Eddie Jordan of Formula One racing fame
 Nigel Vernon Short, Scarlets rugby club, Brown's Hotel (Laugharne) and Welsh Whisky Company
 Mark Davies, Scarlets rugby club and Brown's Hotel
 Nicholas David Gallivan, Scarlets rugby club and Brown's Hotel
 Francine Gail Wickham
 Ewan Gail Short
 Louise Elizabeth Short
 Sarah Janet Davis
 Paul Riley
 Nicholas David Gallivan
 Tim Chadwick
 Scott James Perkins.

Notes

External links
https://www.youtube.com/watch?v=eBkPWtkoiwM
https://www.youtube.com/watch?v=oSZ3HxeVg9s

Nature reserves in Bulgaria
Geography of Varna Province
Landforms of Varna Province
Beaches of Bulgaria